Up In Arms is a British touring theatre company from the south west of England.

The company was founded by the director Alice Hamilton and the writer Barney Norris, who first began working together when they met in their local youth theatre in Salisbury. They have presented work in theatres, woods and village halls across the UK, in co-production or in association with Arcola Theatre, The Bush Theatre, Orange Tree Theatre, Out of Joint Theatre Company, The North Wall Arts Centre and Reading Rep.

They are an associate company at Farnham Maltings, Watford Palace Theatre, The North Wall Arts Centre and Nuffield Theatre, Southampton.

Productions

2020 - Lorca's Blood Wedding retold by Barney Norris (a co-production with Wiltshire Creative)
2019 - Needletail by Barney Norris (a short film produced by Kate Moore)
2019 - In Lipstick by Annie Jenkins (a co-production with the Pleasance Theatre and Ellie Keel)
2017 - The March On Russia by David Storey (a co-production with the Orange Tree Theatre)
2017 - While We're Here by Barney Norris (a co-production with the Bush Theatre and Farnham Maltings)
2016 - German Skerries by Robert Holman (a co-production with the Orange Tree Theatre in association with Reading Rep)
2015 - Eventide by Barney Norris (a co-production with Arcola Theatre in association with the North Wall)
2014-15 - Visitors by Barney Norris (Arcola, Bush and tour)
2012-13 - Fear Of Music by Barney Norris (tour with Out of Joint)
2011 - At First Sight by Barney Norris (tour and Latitude Festival)

References

External links
 

Theatre companies in the United Kingdom
Theatre companies in England
Theatre companies in London